Sarno is an Italian surname. Notable people with the name include:

Devin Sarno (born 1966)
Hector Sarno (1880–1953)
Jacopo Sarno (born 1989)
Jay Sarno (1922–1984)
John E. Sarno (1923–2017)
Joseph W. Sarno (1921–2010)
Kelly Norris Sarno (born 1966)
Michael Sarno (born 1958)
Moody Sarno (1914–1997)
Peter Sarno (born 1979)
Vanessa Sarno (born 2003)

See also 

 Sarno (disambiguation)